General of the Infantry was a general of the branch rank in the Imperial Russian Army (today comparable to OF-8 rank level). It served as the rank below General-feldmarschal (Russian: генерал-фельдмаршал), and was the highest rank one could achieve in the infantry from 1796 to 1917.

See also
 History of Russian military ranks

Military ranks of Russia